The Joseph Bohn House, in Beaver, Utah, was built in 1872.  It was listed on the National Register of Historic Places in 1982.  It was designed and built by Thomas Frazer. It was at one time the home of Butch Cassidy's grandmother Jane Gillies, and many Beaver residents believe Butch Cassidy was born on the property, although not in this house, which was built after his birth.

References

Houses on the National Register of Historic Places in Utah
Houses completed in 1872
Houses in Beaver County, Utah
National Register of Historic Places in Beaver County, Utah